Moniro Ravanipour (born July 24, 1952) is an Iranian-American and internationally acclaimed innovative writer who is the author of ten titles published in Iran, including two collections of short fiction, Kanizu and Satan's Stones, and the novels The Drowned, Heart of Steel, and Gypsy by Fire. Her tales, described as "reminiscent in their fantastic blend of realism, myth, and superstition of writers like Rulfo, Garcia Marquez, even Tutuola," frequently take as their setting the small, remote village in southern Iran where she was born. Nahid Mozaffari, editor of Strange Times, My Dear: The International PEN Anthology of Contemporary Iranian Literature, wrote that Ravanipour "has been successful in the treatment of the complex subjects of tradition and modernity, juxtaposing elements of both, and exposing them in all their contradictions without idealizing either." Ravanipour was among seventeen activists to face trial in Iran for their participation in the 2000 Berlin Conference, accused of taking part in anti-Iran propaganda. Copies of her current work were recently stripped from bookstore shelves in Iran in a countrywide police action. She is a former Brown University International Writers Project Fellow.

Early life

Moniro Ravanipour was born on 1952, in Bushehr, South of Iran. She lived in Bushehr till she was 17, and moved to Shiraz for Pahlavi Private High school. She joined Shiraz Pahlavi University in 1972 and studied Chemistry, and then changed major and took a degree in psychology.

She started theatre in Bushehr and joined the Theater and Literary Society of Bushehr.

Acting and theatre experience
Moniro joined a theatre group in Bushehr called The Theatre and Literary Society of Bushehr. In 1967 Moniro acted in Mother, a play by Manouchehr Atashi. She then continued to act and participated in the production of several plays in Shiraz. Moniro worked with a group of college students for a play called Abazar Ghafari which was banned later. In 1975 she joined Shiraz Theatre Group for producing a play named Moalem, by Shapour Jowrkesh, and in 1976 participated in Tous Theatre Festival, and worked with Shapour Jowrkesh again, for a play named Khoubchehr.

Post revolution
In early post-revolution years she was involved in political activities and was banned from studying. During these years, her brother was executed, all her sister were banned from education in elementary and high school,  one of her sisters and her husband were sentenced to death penalty and escaped Iran, one of her brothers-in-law got arrested  several times. For a decade, she couldn't have a stable place of residence due to the mentioned situation, and she moved from one place to another. She wrote her first short story collection in 1977 named The Sparrow and Mr. President, which was immediately banned from publishing and collected from shelves. After their house was attacked and pillaged in Bushehr, her family moved to Shiraz, and then Moniro moved to Tehran and using a fake name, worked as a worker in Daroupakhsh Factory. After her true identity was revealed using another fake name she worked for another six months in Amidi Factory. Later she worked the grave yard shift nurse in a private hospital, again using a fake name. In 1983 Moniro went back to Shiraz to visit her parents, and she got arrested on the street, when the regime was doing the random arrest of the citizens. It was during the terrible prison days that she decided to become a writer of big fame and success when she is free again, so she would not get killed and forgotten like many others were.

Writing career
Moniro started writing again from 1965, and wrote children's books and screen plays.

A year after Iran–Iraq War, she went to the City Khanaqin boundaries, for writing a novel about war using the identity of a martyr's mother.

After 1988 Moniro published her works using her real name and in 1994 for the first time she was invited the Women's studies Organization of Vienna. Later she was invited for speeches to 21 countries, and then she was invited by: Khaneh Farhanghaye Jahan, Goethe-Institut, Literary Center of Gümüşlük, Bodrum, Gothenburg expo in Sweden, Heinrich Böll Foundation, in Germany, France, and the U.S.

Ravanipour received a fellowship from Brown University. Six month later she received another two year fellowship from Black Mountain Institute's City of Asylum as a visiting author, at University of Nevada, Las Vegas.

Ravanipour has been living in USA since then, writing and publishing her works. Since 2015 Ravanipour self-published her new and translated work on Amazon and Google Play She continues to hold workshops covering writing memoirs, short stories, and reading published works by other Iranian authors.

During her stay in the U.S. she has gone to Sacramento, Pittsburgh, San Francisco, Providence, for lectures and speeches. Her short stories have been translated into: Arabic, Chinese, English, French, German, Kurdish, Polish (by Ivonna Nowicka), Swedish, Turkish.

Style
She is famous for using magic realism, but the truth is that she uses the bitter reality she found in the happenings and real life in her homeland. Despite the bold use of surrealism and magical realism, she uses realism too. The settings of her stories are not just the rural world, but her work pictures life and culture in the urban life as well.

Works

Books

 1990 – The Drowned 
 1990 – Heart of Steel
 1999 – Gypsy by the Fire
 2017 –  These Crazy Nights

Short story collections
 1977 – The Sparrow and Mr. President
 1988 – Kanizu 
 1990 – Satan's Stones
 1994 – Siria, Siria
 2001 – Frankfurt Airport's Woman
 2002 – Nazli
 2015 – Busker
 2016 – The Lovers of Old Testament
 2016 – The Shipwrecked
 2017 – Memoirs of the Mercuric Woman (memories and notes)
 2021 – The Lonely Indian

Children's works
 Snow White, The Most Beautiful Star of the World, a new version of Kadoo Ghelgheleh Zan: Nashr-e Markaz
 Four books and audio tapes: Sahar Co.-
Fables for Children/Games for Children/A Collection of Children's Songs /three books and audio tapes: Iran Cassette Co.
 Three books: Institute for the Intellectual Development of Children and Young Adults
 Twelve books (an adaptation of Saadi's Golestan): Amoo Zanjirbaf

Other works
 1990 – The Fairy Tales and Beliefs of Southern Iran's Region

Play
 1976 – Rostam az Shahnameh Raft (Rostam Left the Epic of the Kings)

Screenplays
 1987 – The Night Shift Nurse, based on her screenplay named "Water"
 1994 – The Good Days of Life

See also
 List of Iranian women

References

External links
 Official website
 Amazon bookstore page
 https://web.archive.org/web/20090630040930/http://www.golshirifoundation.org/award03.htm
 http://kadivar.maktuob.net/archives/2007/04/26/829.php
 

20th-century Persian-language writers
1954 births
Living people
People from Bushehr
Iranian women short story writers
21st-century Persian-language writers
20th-century Iranian women writers
21st-century Iranian women writers